American Life is a 2003 album by Madonna

American Life may also refer to:

The lifestyle and culture of the United States

Books and broadcasting
An American Life, an autobiography by Ronald Reagan
 AmericanLife TV Network, an American cable television network
This American Life, a public radio anthology program

Music
"American Life" (song), a song by Madonna from the album of the same title
"American Life", a song by Primus from the album Sailing the Seas of Cheese

See also